Funtanaccia is an archaeological site in Corsica.  It is located in the commune of Sartène.

In a distance of 300 m are the stone rows of Stantari and Rinaghju.

Archaeological sites in Corsica